Car-napping is a German comedy about international car thieves from 1980 with Bernd Stephan and Anny Duperey.

Story 
On returning from an extended vacation, designer Robert Mehring must notice to his complete surprise that the company he used to work for does not exist anymore. The owner of the business, Benninger, has secretly liquidated the business and fled abroad with Mehrings drafts. Mehring locates Benninger on the Côte d'Azur and confronts him – without any success.

Later Mehring has to realize that his Porsche 911 was stolen, including all his papers. The local police chief makes clear that Mehring can't expect any help from the side of the authorities. Incidentally a short time later Mehring discovers his car in traffic and confronts the thieves, two Italians named Carlo and Mario, as they want to sell the 911 to a dealer. In return for not being reported to the police, the car thieves offering their cooperation. At first Mehring declines, but after learning that his former boss Benninger owns a car dealership in Paris with 40 Porsches, Mehring accepts the offer of Carlo and Mario. With the help of other chums, they steal all 40 cars in a single night and sell them.

Mehring becomes the head of the "Carnappers" stealing luxury vehicles on order, including the printer Herrmann Aichinger who was also a victim of Benninger and is now making falsificated documents The "business" runs well until Mehring gets blackmailed and falls in love with Claudia Klessing, a lawyer. He wants to cop out, but just after the final coup in Salzburg he's been caught by the police. Thanks to the help of Claudia and Herrmann, Mehring can escape from pretrial detention.

Cast
  – Robert Mehring
 Anny Duperey – Claudia Klessing
  –  Herrmann Aichinger
 Peter Kuhnert –  Mario
 Luigi Tortora –  Carlo
 Ivan Desny –  Consul Barnet
 Adrian Hoven –  Benninger
 Götz Kauffmann –
  – Fischer
 Michel Galabru – Thibaut
 Eddie Constantine – Laroux, police officer
 Adolfo Celi – Head of police in Palermo

Critics

External links

1980 films
1980s crime comedy films
German crime comedy films
West German films
1980s German-language films
German heist films
Films about automobiles
Films set in Austria
Films set in France
Films set on the French Riviera
Films set in Italy
1980 comedy films
1980s German films